Sabian may refer to:

Sabians, name of a religious group mentioned in the Quran, historically adopted by:
Mandaeans, Gnostic sect from the marshlands of southern Iraq claiming John the Baptist as their most important prophet
Sabians of Harran, astral religion from Harran (Upper Mesopotamia) associated with Hermeticism and other forms of pagan philosophy
Sabian Cymbals, a Canadian-Armenian cymbal manufacturing company
BLK Jeez (born 1979), American wrestler formerly known as Sabian

See also
Sabaeans, an ancient south Arabian people speaking the Sabaean language